This is a list of newspapers in Illinois.

Daily newspapersThis is a list of daily newspapers currently published in Illinois, USA. For weekly newspapers, see List of newspapers in Illinois.

 The Beacon-News – Aurora
 Belleville News-Democrat – Belleville
 Belvidere Daily Republican – Belvidere
 The Benton Evening News – Benton
 The Breeze-Courier – Taylorville
 The Carmi Times – Carmi
 Centralia Morning Sentinel – Centralia
 The Chicago Defender – Chicago
 Chicago Sun-Times – Chicago
 Chicago Tribune – Chicago
 The Clay County Advocate-Press – Flora
 Commercial-News – Danville
 The Courier-News – Elgin
 Daily Chronicle – DeKalb
 Daily Gazette – Sterling
 Daily Herald – Arlington Heights
 Daily Journal – Kankakee
 The Daily Leader – Pontiac
 The Daily Ledger – Canton
 Daily Record – Lawrenceville
 The Daily Register – Harrisburg
 The Daily Republican – Marion
 Daily Republican Register – Mt. Carmel
 Daily Review Atlas – Monmouth
 Daily Southtown (was SouthtownStar) – Tinley Park
 The Dispatch – Moline
 Du Quoin Evening Call – Du Quoin
 Edwardsville Intelligencer – Edwardsville
 Effingham Daily News – Effingham
 Herald & Review (Herald & Review, pub.; 1989− ) – Decatur
 The Decatur Herald & Review (Herald & Review, pub.; 1988−1989) – Decatur
 The Herald & Review (Decatur Herald and Review, pub.; 1982−1988) – Decatur
 The Morning Herald & Review (Decatur Herald and Review, pub.; 1980−1982) – Decatur
 ?preceded by? Decatur Daily Review (1919−1980) – Decatur
 The Decatur Herald (Herald-Despatch Co., pub.; 1899−1980) – Decatur
 Morning Herald-Dispatch (Herald-Despatch Co., pub.; 1890−1899) – Decatur
 The Decatur Daily Despatch (W. F. Calhoun, pub.; 1889−189?) – Decatur
 The Decatur Morning Herald (Hostetler & Ela, pub.; 1880−1890) – Decatur
 The Herald-News – Joliet
 Journal-Courier – Jacksonville
 Journal Gazette & Times-Courier – Mattoon
 The Journal Standard – Freeport
 Journal Star – Peoria
 Kane County Chronicle – Geneva
 Lake County News-Sun – Waukegan
 Lincoln Courier – Lincoln
 The McDonough County Voice – Macomb
 Morris Daily Herald – Morris
 Mt. Vernon Morning Sentinel – Mt. Vernon
 Mt. Vernon Register-News – Mt. Vernon
 Naperville Sun – Naperville
 The News-Gazette – Champaign
 News-Tribune – LaSalle
 Northwest Herald – Crystal Lake
 Olney Daily Mail – Olney
 The Pantagraph – Bloomington
 Paris Beacon-News – Paris
 Pekin Daily Times – Pekin
 Quincy Herald-Whig – Quincy
 The Register-Mail – Galesburg
 Robinson Daily News – Robinson
 The Rock Island Argus (Moline Dispatch Pub. Co., pub.; 1986− ) – Rock Island
 The Argus (J. W. Potter Co., pub.; 1971−1986) – Rock Island
 The Rock Island Argus (J. W. Potter Co., pub; 1923−1971) – Rock Island
 Milan Independent (Lewis Guldenzopf, pub.; 1902−1971) – Milan
 Milan Weekly Independent (C. D. McLaughlin, pub.; 1902−1902) – Milan
 The Rock Island Argus and Daily Union (J. W. Potter Co., pub.; 1920−1923) – Rock Island
 Rockford Register Star – Rockford
 Shelbyville Daily Union – Shelbyville
 The Sidell Reporter – Sidell
 The Southern Illinoisan – Carbondale
 Star Courier – Kewanee
 The State Journal-Register – Springfield
 The Telegraph – Alton
 The Telegraph – Dixon
 The Times – OttawaWeekly and bi-weekly newspapers

Bond County
 Greenville Advocate – Greenville

Boone County
 The Boone County Journal – Belvidere

Bureau County
 Bureau County Republican – Princeton
 Indian Valley Chief – Tiskilwa

Calhoun County
 Calhoun News Herald – Hardin

Carroll County
 Carroll County Review – Thomson
 Mount Carroll Mirror-Democrat – Mount Carroll
 Prairie Advocate News – Lanark
 Savanna Times Journal – Savanna

Cass County
 Cass County Star-Gazette – Beardstown
 La Estrella de Beardstown – Beardstown

Christian County
 Morrisonville Times – Morrisonville
 Pana News – Pana

Coles County
 The Leader – Coles County

Cook County
 Austin Weekly News – Oak Park
 Berwyn Suburban Life – Berwyn and Cicero
 Bridgeport News – Chicago
 The Chicago Crusader – Chicago
 The Chicago Jewish Home – Chicago
 Chicago Jewish News – Skokie
 Chicago Journal – Chicago
 Chicago Reader – Chicago
 Chicago Shimpo – Chicago
 Desplaines Valley News – Summit
 Forest Park Review – Forest Park
 Greek Press – Chicago
 Hyde Park Herald –  South Side of Chicago, especially Hyde Park and Kenwood neighborhoods
 La Grange Suburban Life – La Grange
 Lemont Suburban Life – Lemont
 Oak Park Journal – Oak Park
 The Reporter – Palos Heights
 Riverside & Brookfield Suburban Life – Riverside and Brookfield
 Riverside-Brookfield Landmark – Riverside and Brookfield
 Skokie Review – Skokie
 Wednesday Journal – Oak Park and River Forest
 Windy City Times – Chicago

DeWitt County
 The Clinton Journal – Clinton

DuPage County
 Addison Suburban Life – Addison
 Carol Stream Suburban Life – Carol Stream
 Downers Grove Suburban Life – Downers Grove
 Elmhurst Suburban Life – Elmhurst
 Glen Ellyn Suburban Life – Glen Ellyn
 Hinsdale Suburban Life – Hinsdale, Burr Ridge, Clarendon Hills, Darien and Oak Brook
 Lisle Suburban Life – Lisle
 Lombard Suburban Life – Lombard
 Villa Park Suburban Life – Villa Park and Oakbrook Terrace
 West Chicago Suburban Life – West Chicago, Warrenville and Winfield
 Westmont Suburban Life – Westmont
 Wheaton Suburban Life – Wheaton
 Woodridge Suburban Life – Woodridge

Fayette County
 Farina News – Farina
 The Leader-Union – Vandalia
 Ramsey News-Journal – Ramsey
 St. Elmo Banner – St. Elmo
 St. Elmo Devonian – St. Elmo

Fulton County
 Astoria South Fulton Argus – Astoria
 Fulton Democrat – Lewistown

Gallatin County
 Gallatin Democrat – Shawneetown
 Ridgway News – Ridgway

Greene County
 Greene County Shopper – Carrollton
 Greene Prairie Press – Carrollton

Hancock County
 Augusta Eagle-Scribe – Augusta

Hardin County
Hardin County Independent – Elizabethtown

Henry County
 Cambridge Chronicle – Cambridge
 Geneseo Republic – Geneseo
 Orion Gazette – Orion

Iroquois County
 The Advocate – Clifton
 Cissna Park News – Cissna Park
 The Lone Tree Leader – Onarga

Jackson County
 Carbondale Times – Carbondale
 Murphysboro American – Murphysboro (ceased publications in summer 2015)

Jersey County
 Jersey County Journal – Jerseyville
 Jersey County Shopper – Jerseyville
 Jersey County Star – Jerseyville

Johnson County
 Vienna Times – Vienna

Kane County
 Batavia Republican – Batavia
 Fox Valley Labor News – Aurora
 Fox Valley News Shopper – Yorkville, Oswego, Sandwich, Sugar Grove
 Geneva Republican – Geneva
 The Voice – Aurora

Kankakee County
 Country Herald – Bourbonnais)

Kendall County
 Fox Valley News Shopper – Yorkville,  Oswego,  Sandwich, Sugar Grove, Plano

Knox County
 Abingdon/Avon Argus Sentinel – Abingdon
 The Paper – Knox County
 The Register-Mail  – Galesburg
 The Zephyr – Knox County

Lake County
 Barrington Suburban Life – Barrington
 Lake County Suburban Life – Grayslake (formerly the Lake County Journal)

LaSalle County
 The Streator Voice – Streator

Lee County
 Sauk Valley Newspapers – Lee County

Macon County
 African-American Voice (H.G. Livingston, pub.) – Decatur (succeeds The Voice of the Black Community, published in Springfield)
 The Blue Mound Leader – Blue Mound
 Decatur Tribune – Decatur

Macoupin County
 Bunker Hill Gazette-News – Bunker Hill
 Coal Country Times – Gillespie
 Girard Gazette – Girard
 Macoupin County Enquirer~Democrat – Carlinville
 Northwestern News – Palmyra
 Southwestern Journal – Brighton
 Staunton Star Times – Staunton
 Virden Recorder – Virden

Madison County
 AdVantage News – Alton
 Highland News Leader – Highland
 Madison County Chronicle – Worden
 The Madison / St. Clair Record – Edwardsville
 Troy Tribune – Troy

Mason County
 Mason County Democrat – Havana

Massac County
 The Metropolis Planet – Metropolis
 The Southern Scene – Metropolis

McDonough County
 Macomb Eagle – Macomb

 McHenry County 
 Sun Day – Huntley
My Huntley News -- Huntley

Menard County
 The Petersburg Observer – Petersburg

Mercer County
 The Times Record – Aledo

Monroe County
 Monroe County Independent-News – Columbia
 Republic-Times-News – Waterloo

Montgomery County
 The Journal-News – Hillsboro
 Nokomis Free Press-Progress – Nokomis

Moultrie County
 News Progress – Sullivan

Ogle County
 Rochelle News-Leader – Rochelle

Peoria County
 Chillicothe Times-Bulletin – Chillicothe

Piatt County
 The Journal Republican-Monticello – Monticello

Pike County
 The Paper – Barry
 The Pike County Express – Pittsfield
 Pike Press – Pittsfield

Pope County
 The Herald Enterprise – Golconda

Putnam County
 The Putnam County Record – Granville

Richland County
 Olney Daily Mail – Olney

St. Clair County
 The Madison / St. Clair Record – Edwardsville

Sangamon County
 Illinois Times – Springfield
 The Sangamon Star
 The Sentinel (Wilson Publications, pub.; 2004− ) – Illiopolis
 preceded by Illiopolis Sentinel (Frank J. Bell, pub.; 19??−2004) – Illiopolis
 preceded by Niantic-Harristown County Line Observer (Cindy Wilson, pub.; 2001−2004) – Illiopolis

Stark County
 The Stark County News – Toulon

Tazewell County
 Delavan Times – Delavan

Union County
 Gazette-Democrat – Anna

Warren County
 Roseville Independent – Roseville

Washington County
 Nashville News – Nashville
 The Okawville Times – Okawville

Whiteside County
 Erie Review – Erie
 Fulton Journal – Fulton
 Prophetstown Echo – Prophetstown
 Whiteside Sentinel – Morrison

Will County
 The Frankfort Station – Frankfort
 The Homer Horizon – Homer Glen
 KSKJ Voice (formerly Amerikanski Slovenec; bi-monthly) – Joliet
 The Mokena Messenger – Mokena
 The New Lenox Patriot – New Lenox

Winnebago County
 Rock River Times – Rockford

Monthly newspapers
 Chicago Dispatcher – Chicago
 The Marengo-Union Times – Marengo

Foreign-language newspapers
 Arbeiter-Zeitung – Chicago
 Bulgaria SEGA Newspaper (Hoffman Estates) - Est 2005 – Bulgarian
 Den Danske Pioneer (The Danish Pioneer) – Hoffman Estates (Danish)
 Dziennik Związkowy  (Polish Daily News) – Chicago (Polish)
 El Conquistador – Geneva (Spanish and English)
 Hlas Národa (The Voice of the Nation) – Chicago
 Naród Polski – Chicago
 Naujienos (socialist newspaper) (Lithuanian Daily News) – Chicago
 Nedelni Hlasatel (formerly Denni Hlasatel) – Berwyn
 Sonntagpost und Milwaukee deutsche Zeitung – Chicago
 Svenska Amerikanaren Tribunen – Chicago
 Ukrainske Slovo Newspaper (Hoffman Estates) - Est 2002 – Ukrainian
 Zgoda (Harmony) – Chicago

University and college newspapers
 The Bradley Scout – Bradley University
 The Chicago Maroon – University of Chicago
 The Columbia Chronicle – Columbia College Chicago
 The Daily Eastern News – Eastern Illinois University
 The Daily Egyptian – Southern Illinois University Carbondale
 The Daily Illini – University of Illinois at Urbana–Champaign
 The Daily Northwestern – Northwestern University
 The DePaulia – DePaul University
 ICC Harbinger – Illinois Central College
 The Lewis Flyer – Lewis University
 Loyola Phoenix – Loyola University Chicago
 The McKendree Review – McKendree University
 Northern Star – Northern Illinois University
 South Side Weekly – University of Chicago
 The Stentor – Lake Forest College
 The Vidette – Illinois State University
 The Western Courier – Western Illinois University

Newspapers no longer published in Illinois
 Draugas (The Friend) – formerly published in Chicago (Lithuanian language)

Defunct newspapers
 Abendpost und Milwaukee deutsche Zeitung – Chicago (German language)
 Arbeiter-Zeitung (1837–1931) – Chicago (German language)
 Assyrian Guardian – Chicago
 Chicago Jewish Star (1991–2018) – Skokie
 Chicago Whip (1919–1939)
 Dahlgren Echo (1899–?) – Dahlgren
 Daily Journal (Wheaton, Illinois) (1933–1992) – Wheaton
 The Herald/Country Market – Bourbonnais
 Decatur Daily Review (Review Pub. Co., pub.; 1891−1917) – Decatur
 succeeded by? Decatur Daily Review (1919−1980) – Decatur
 Daily Republican (Hamsher & Calhoun, pub.; 1894−1899) – Decatur
 Decatur Daily Republican (Hamsher & Mosser, pub.; 1875−1894) – Decatur
 The Daily Republican (Hamsher & Mosser, pub.; 1872−1875) – Decatur
 Daily Decatur Republican (Hamsher & Mosser, pub.; 1867−1872) – Decatur
 Morning Review (Review Pub. Co., pub.; 1888−1891) – Decatur
 The Daily Review (W. J. Mize & Col., pub.; 1886−1888) – Decatur
 Morning Review (Jack & Mize, pub.; 1884−1886) – Decatur
 The Decatur Morning Review (Jack & Mize, pub.; 1883−1884) – Decatur
 The Morning Review (S. S. Jack, pub.; 1881−1883) – Decatur
 Decatur Daily Review (Wm. H. Bayne, pub.; 18??−1881) – Decatur
 The Decatur Local Review (Alfred Wuensch, pub.; 1873−18??) – Decatur
 Decatur Weekly Republican (Hamsher & Mosser, pub.; 1877−1898) – Decatur
 The Decatur Republican (Stanley & Mosser, pub; 1867−1877) – Decatur
 The Evening Bulletin (John Lindsay & Co., pub.; 18??−1???) – Decatur
 Labor Bulletin (John Lindsay & Co., pub.; 1886−18??) – Decatur
 Daily Labor Bulletin (John Lindsay & Co., pub.; 1885−1886) – Decatur
 Jewish Sentinel Or The Sentinel (1911-1996)
 The Express – Tallula
 Naujienos (socialist newspaper) – Chicago
 Skandinaven (1866–1941) – Chicago (Norwegian Language)
 South County News – Gillespie
 The Union Signal (1883-2016) - Chicago, Evanston
 The Voice of the Black Community (The Voice, pub.; 1968−1993) – Decatur
 Weekly Thursday News (Michael Lakin, pub.; 1997−1997) – Mt. Pulaski
 Weekly News (Michael Lakin, pub.; 1989−1997) – Mt. Pulaski
 Mount Pulaski Weekly News (Weekly News, pub.; 1988−1988) – Mt. Pulaski
 Hometown Weekly News (Michael Lakin, pub.; 1988−1988) – Mt. Pulaski
 Independent Free Press (Michael Lakin, pub.; 1988−1988) – Mt. Pulaski
 Weekly Merchant (1987−1987) – Mt. Pulaski
 Times News (Harry J. Wible, pub.; 1961−1988) – Mt. Pulaski
 Mt. Pulaski Times-News (Harry J. Wible, pub.; 1932−1961) – Mt. Pulaski
 Mt. Pulaski Times (Smedley & Hansel, pub.; 190?−1932) – Mt. Pulaski
 Mt. Pulaski Weekly News (S. Linn Reidler, pub.; 18??−1932) – Mt. Pulaski
 The Prairie Post (Bob Wilson, pub.; 1958−1989) – Maroa
 The Argenta Register (G. Huntoon, pub.; 1917−1958) – Argenta

See also
 Illinois Newspaper Project
 Newspapers of the Chicago metropolitan area

References

External links
 Chronicling America: Historic American Newspapers at the Library of Congress
 eCirc at the Audit Bureau of Circulations, provides circuluation figures based on latest FAS-FAX Report
 Illinois Press Association
 Terence A. Tanner Collection at the Illinois History and Lincoln Collections at the University of Illinois Library at Urbana-Champaign